Myles Brennan (born March 2, 1999) is a former American football quarterback.

Early years
Brennan attended St. Stanislaus High School in Bay St. Louis, Mississippi. During his career, he set Mississippi high school career records for total offense (16,168 yards), passing touchdowns (166) and passing yards (15,138). He took the Rock-A-Chaws to state title game appearances in 2014 and 2015, both losses to Noxubee County, where he faced future Tennessee Titans defensive end Jeffery Simmons. He was the Biloxi Sun Herald Player of the Year in 2014, 2015 and 2016. Brennan played in the 2017 Under Armour All-American Game, where he was named a team captain. He committed to Louisiana State University (LSU) to play college football.

College career

2017 season

In 2017, Brennan played in six games as a backup quarterback to Danny Etling his true freshman year. He completed 14 of 24 passes for 182 yards and a touchdown.

2018 season

In 2018, as the backup to Joe Burrow, Brennan played in one game, completing four of six passes for 65 yards, and took a redshirt.

2019 season

In 2019, Brennan played in 10 games and completed 24 of 40 passes for 353 yards with a touchdown, as the Tigers won the national championship. With Burrow graduating, Brennan was the favorite to take over as the starter for LSU in 2020.

2020 season

Prior to the 2020 season, Brennan was announced to be the opening day starter against Mississippi State. LSU lost the game 44–34 as Brennan completed 27 for 46 for 345 yards and 3 touchdowns to 2 interceptions. Opposing MSU quarterback K. J. Costello threw for 623 yards, setting a new SEC single-game passing record. Brennan suffered an abdominal injury against Missouri in Week 3, sidelining him for the remainder of the season.

2021 season

Following a season-ending injury suffered by Brennan during preseason training camp, Max Johnson was named LSU's starting quarterback.

On November 1, 2021, LSU head coach Ed Orgeron confirmed that Brennan would be entering the transfer portal to leave LSU. However, on December 16, 2021, Brennan announced he would opt to remain at LSU under new head coach Brian Kelly.

2022 season
After opting to remain at LSU, Coach Brian Kelly announced on August 15, 2022 that Brennan has chosen to end his football career.

Statistics

References

External links
LSU Tigers bio

1999 births
Living people
American football quarterbacks
LSU Tigers football players
People from Long Beach, Mississippi
Players of American football from Mississippi